The 2016 Dockerty Cup was a football (soccer) knockout-cup competition held between men's clubs in Victoria, Australia in 2016, the annual edition of the Dockerty Cup.  Victorian soccer clubs from the 5 State League Divisions, regional, metros and masters leagues - plus the 12 Clubs from the National Premier Leagues Victoria - competed for the Dockerty Cup trophy.

This knockout competition was won by Bentleigh Greens, their first title.

The competition also served as Qualifying Rounds for the 2016 FFA Cup. In addition to the two Victorian A-League clubs, the four semi-finalists qualified for the final rounds of the 2016 FFA Cup, entering at the Round of 32.

Format

Preliminary rounds

Victorian clubs, participate in the 2016 FFA Cup via the preliminary rounds. This was open to teams from the National Premier Leagues Victoria, Victorian State League divisions, regional and metros leagues. Teams were seeded in terms of which round they would enter based on their division in 2016.

A total of 202 clubs entered into the competition (eleven greater than the previous year), and the four qualifiers for the semi-final rounds are:

Semi finals
A total of four teams were scheduled to take part in this stage of the competition, with the matches played on 13 July and 19 July.

Final
The Final was played at the neutral venue of Broadmeadows Valley Park on 17 August.

References

Dockerty Cup